Khedinji Kanthappa Hegde, better known as K. K. Hegde, was an Indian politician from the Indian National Congress who the Minister of Health in the Government of Karnataka (then known as Mysore State).

References

State cabinet ministers of Karnataka
People from Udupi
Mysore MLAs 1957–1962
Indian National Congress politicians from Karnataka